"A Midwinter Night's Dream" is also the name of episodes from The Golden Girls, and Frasier.
 
A Midwinter Night's Dream is the eighth studio album by the Canadian singer, songwriter, accordionist, harpist, and pianist Loreena McKennitt, released on October 28, 2008.

Origins
The album is an extended version of A Winter Garden: Five Songs for the Season (1995). 8 new tracks (recorded at Peter Gabriel's Real World Studios during spring 2008) were added to the original 5 songs of the 1995 EP.

A Midwinter Night's Dream takes the place of A Winter Garden, which has been deleted from the Quinlan Road catalogue.

Track listing

"The Holly & the Ivy" (traditional, music by McKennitt)  – 4:49
"Un flambeau, Jeannette, Isabelle" (traditional)  – 3:06
"The Seven Rejoices of Mary" (traditional)  – 4:34
"Noël Nouvelet!" (traditional)  – 5:11
"Good King Wenceslas" (John Mason Neale)  – 3:16
"Coventry Carol" (traditional, music arranged & adapted by McKennitt)  – 2:18
"God Rest Ye Merry, Gentlemen" (Abdelli version) (traditional, music arranged and adapted by McKennitt) – 7:19
"Snow" (lyrics by Archibald Lampman, music by McKennitt)  – 5:05
"Breton Carol" (traditional)  – 3:30
"Seeds of Love" (traditional, music by McKennitt)  – 4:54
"Gloucestershire Wassail" (traditional)  – 2:39
"Emmanuel" (traditional)  – 4:55
"In the Bleak Midwinter" (Gustav Holst)  – 2:43

Chart performance

Personnel
Loreena McKennitt – vocals, piano, accordion and harp
Brian Hughes – oud and guitar
Hugh Marsh – violin
Caroline Lavelle – cello
Donald Quan – viola and percussion
Ben Grossman – hurdy-gurdy and percussion
Simon Edwards – bass
Rick Lazar – percussion
Stratis Psaradellis – Greek lyra and Greek lute

References

Loreena McKennitt albums
2008 Christmas albums
Christmas albums by Canadian artists
Folk Christmas albums